Dae Inseon (r. 906–926) was the last king of Balhae, a kingdom in northeast Asia occupying parts of Manchuria, northern Korea, and the Russian Far East. Dae Inseon was also the last king of Balhae. He and his armies were pushed back and eventually defeated by the Khitan.

Last years of Balhae 

This was a time of momentous change for Balhae and its neighbors. In the case of Silla, the nobility increasingly became independent and rebellions sprang up throughout the country. Meanwhile, in China, the Tang faced serious crises caused by the An Lushan Rebellion and many other uprisings. Finally, Zhu Wen established the Later Liang, marking the end of the Tang dynasty in 907.

Dae concentrated on increasing defense capabilities against the threat of new powers and was in favor of allying with the Goryeo Dynasty. However, the interference of the nobility did not allow that to happen. The Khitans' growing power in Manchuria was the most threatening to Balhae. Eventually, they invaded Balhae in 925 and the capital Sanggyeong (also known as Holhan fortress) fell after ten days. In 926, Balhae came to an end, some of the nobles were moved to the Khitan proper by the Liao Dynasty, while many of its populace including many of the nobility fled to Goryeo.

Aftermath 
The Khitans established the Dongdan Kingdom on the former territories of Balhae, which was ruled by crown prince Yelü Bei. The Balhae royal family was allowed to share control of the former Balhae territories with Liao aristocrats because of the political chaos and lack of a strong administration following Balhae's fall. Dae Inseon likely served in high positions during Yelü Bei's rule and possibly shared power with the latter.

Dae Inseon's son and the last Crown Prince of Balhae, Dae Gwang-Hyeon, gathered an army and continued to spearhead resistance against the Liao. Many members of the Dae Clan lead Later Balhae and refused to submit to the Liao as Dae Inseon had. In 937, Dae Gwang-Hyeon led tens of thousands of Balhae refugees and fled to Goryeo, where he was warmly received by Wang Geon, the founder of the Goryeo Dynasty, which is seen by Korean historians as having brought the unification of the two successor states of Goguryeo.

See also
List of Korean monarchs
History of Korea

References

Balhae rulers
10th-century rulers in Asia